The Departmental Council of Yvelines is the deliberative assembly of the Yvelines department. Its headquarters are in Versailles in the Hôtel de la Préfecture.

Executive

President 
Pierre Bédier (LR) is the president of the departmental council since July 2021.

Vice-Presidents 
The president of the departmental council is assisted by 12 vice-presidents chosen from among the departmental advisers. Each of them has a delegation of authority.

Composition 
The departmental council of Yvelines includes 42 departmental councilors from the 21 cantons of Yvelines.

References 

Yvelines
Yvelines
Politics of Île-de-France